Thiruthuraipoondi is a municipality in Tiruvarur district in the Indian state of Tamil Nadu. Thiruthuraipoondi is an agricultural town located south of Thiruvarur district. The town is located at a distance of 28 km (17 mi) from the district headquarters Thiruvarur.

Tirutturaipundi is a taluk in Tanjore District (Madras Presidency), after independence, it was a part of Thanjavur district till 1991. It subsequently became a part of the newly formed Tiruvarur district  on January 1, 1997. 

The Mulli river passes through the town. Most of the people work in agriculture.

As of 2011, the town had a population of 24,404.

History
The town was ruled by various dynasties including the Early Cholas, Kalabhras, Pallavas, Medieval Cholas, Later Cholas; and later by Pandyas, Vijayanagara Empire, Delhi Sultanate, Thanjavur Nayaks, Thanjavur Marathas and the British Empire.

Geography 
Thiruthuraipoondi or Thiruthuraipundi ( TTP) is an agricultural town located south of District Thiruvarur.

Satellite pictures and carbon dating of some ancient beaches between Thiruthuraipoondi and Kodiyakarai show the Thiruthuraipoondi beach dates back 6,000 years and the Kodiyakarai beach 1,100 years. In other words, the sea was near Thiruthuraipoondi 6,000 years ago and reached Kodiyakarai around 1,100 years ago.

Thiruthuraipoondi is located at center of many towns like Mannargudi, Thiruvarur, Muthupet, Vedaranyam, Velankanni, Nagapattinam. Thiruthuraipoondi is located at Thiruvarur district.

Economy 
Agriculture is the main occupation for people living in Thiruthuraipoondi and surrounding areas. Rice and dhal items grow here. The short-term Kuruvai and long-term Samba rice crops are cultivated depending on the water sources. Thiruthuraipoondi Cooperative Urban Bank was established in 1911, and is the oldest bank in the city
. Several major banks have branches in Thiruthuraipoondi.

Market 
Thiruthuraipoondi Municipal Market is one of the important commercial centre, which supports the daily needs of population residing in and the surrounding rural areas & the town. The Municipality market is located in the central area accommodates 45 shops. 
The commercial activities are concentrated along TVR Road, Mannai salai, R.S. Road, D.M.C. Road, Bazar Street. Thiruthuraipoondi Municipal Market is one of the important commercial centres and generates revenue . At present, Municipal market is located in the central area near old bus stand area. The existing market needs to be retrofitted with additional facilities. Thiruthuraipoondi Municipality maintained one Fish market at Chetty street, Thiruthuraipoondi.

Demographics 

According to 2011 census, Thiruthuraipoondi had a population of 24,404 with a sex-ratio of 1,036 females for every 1,000 males, much above the national average of 929. A total of 2,324 were under the age of six, constituting 1,180 males and 1,144 females. Scheduled Castes and Scheduled Tribes accounted for 29.7% and 1.84% of the population respectively. The average literacy of the town was 80.19%, compared to the national average of 72.99%. The town had a total of : 6263 households. There were a total of 9,378 workers, comprising 607 cultivators, 885 main agricultural labourers, 92 in house hold industries, 4,833 other workers, 2,961 marginal workers, 57 marginal cultivators, 2,076 marginal agricultural labourers, 41 marginal workers in household industries and 787 other marginal workers. 
As per the religious census of 2011, Thiruthuraipoondi had 90.41% Hindus, 6.36% Muslims, 3.09% Christians, 0.04% Sikhs, 0.09% following other religions and 0.01% following no religion or did not indicate any religious preference.

Politics 
Since 1971, Tiruthuraipundi assembly constituency has been consistently voting for Communist Party of India. This is one of few constituents in Tamil Nadu, that is a bastion for communist parties in Tamil Nadu. G. shri Palaniswamy, of CPI, has won this constituent, four straight elections, from 1989 to 2001. He won this constituent in 1991, which made it one of handful of constituents, that was won by a party other than ADMK/Congress, that year.

Tiruthuraipundi comes under the Nagapattinam (Lok Sabha constituency). The current Member of Parliament from the constituency is Dr.k.gopal from the ADMK From 1957, the Nagapattinam parliament seat was held by the Indian National Congress for 4 times during 1957–1961, 1962–67, 1991–96, and 1996–98 elections. CPI won the seat for 5 times during 1971–77, 1977–80, 1989–91 elections. DMK won 4 times during 1980–84, 1999–2004, 2004–09 and 2011 elections. ADMK won the seat once during 1984–89.

Municipality 
Thiruthuraipoondi comes under the Thiruthuraipoondi assembly constituency which elects a member to the Tamil Nadu Legislative Assembly once every five years and it is a part of the Nagapattinam constituency which elects its member of Parliament (MP) once in five years. The Thiruthuraipoondi Municipality is divided into 24 wards for which elections are held every 5 years. The Thiruthuraipoondi Municipality has population of 24,404 of which 11,985 are males while 12,419 are females as per report released by Census India 2011

The functions of the municipality are devolved into six departments: general administration/personnel, engineering, revenue, health, town planning and information technology (IT). All these departments are under the control of a municipal commissioner.

Roadways and railways are the major mode of transportation to the town.

Utility services

Electricity 
Electricity supply to Thiruthuraipoondi is regulated and distributed by the Tamil Nadu Electricity Board (TNEB). The town and its suburbs forms the Trichy Electricity Distribution Circle.
Thiruthuraipoondi TNEB office located at Anna Nagar, Thruthuraipoondi and Thiruthuraipoondi 
Sub-power station located at Pallankoil, Tiruthuraipoondi

Water 
water supply to the town was provided from Kollidam River at Thiruvaikavur. Water supply is provided by the municipality of Thiruthuraipoondi; there are 9 over Head Tanks with a capacity of 17.15 lakhs litres in municipality.

Solid waste 
Solid waste is collected by Thiruthuraipoondi Municipality every day by door-to-door collection. Subsequently, the source segregation and dumping is carried out by the sanitary department of the municipality.the Compost Yard(4.50 Acres) is located at Vedhai road.

Medical and emergency 
There are two government hospitals, One maternity centre and ten private hospitals and private clinics in Thiruthuraipoondi and municipal health care centre at Ramamada street.

Law and order 
Town Police Station of Thiruthuraipoondi, located at Mannargudi Road.
All Women Police Station of Thiruthuraipoondi, located at Mannargudi Road.
Deputy Superintendent of Police Camp Office, located at opposite of Police Station.
Combined District Municipal Court Building located at D.M.C road.

Paddy festival 
Nel Thiruvizha or Paddy Festival is one of the biggest seed exchange programmes in the whole country, organised every year by the Save our Rice Campaign and the local host organisation – CREATE – at Thiruthuraipoondi. It was Nel Jayaraman who initiated this festival in 2007, when he, as the state coordinator of the campaign, had collected 15 indigenous seeds along with his mentor and guru Dr Nammalvar. In 12 years, he and his followers, enthusiastic organic farmers and seed savers, have collected about 174 varieties, most of them on the verge of extinction, from various regions in Tamil Nadu.

Transport 

Thiruthuraipoondi is well connected by road and rail with neighbouring towns.

Road 
NH-32 (ECR) connecting Chennai–Nagapattinam–Velankanni–Thiruthuraipoondi–Muthupet–Ramanathapuram–Thoothukudi–Kanyakumari, SH-23 Thiruthuraipoondi to Mayiladuthurai via Thiruvarur, SH-63 connecting Thanjavur–Vedharanyam and Kodiyakarai,

Buses are available to lot of major towns like Thiruvarur, Mannargudi, Muthupet, Pattukkottai, Velankanni, Nagapattinam, Vedharanyam, Kodiyakarai, Kumbakonam, Mayiladuthurai, Thanjavur, Trichy. Also good number of buses plying to long-distance places like Coimbatore, Chennai, Madurai, Karur, Namakkal, Salem, Tirupur, Palani, Dindigul, Puducherry, Chidambaram, Kanchipuram, Viluppuram, Thiruchendur, Thoothukudi, Ramanathapuram, Ervadi, Sivagangai, Karaikudi, Thisayanvilai, Rameswaram, Mudukulathur, Sayalgudi and Bengaluru, Kulasekarapattinam, Tirunelveli Nagercoil Trivandrum as well. 
TNSTC Ticket reservation counter in New busstand, State Express Transport Corporation (Tamil Nadu) (SETC) and several private bus operators ply to cities like Chennai, Puthucherry, Salem, Hosur, Bengaluru, Coimbatore, Ramanathapuram, Thoothukudi, Tirunelveli, Nagercoil, Soon SETC and TNSTC planned to operate services to Tirupathi, Vellore, Erode and Coimbatore.

Rail 

Education 
There are four government high schools out of a total of 12 schools in the town. The Government Higher Secondary School (formerly Board High School), founded by the British government in 1936.This is one of the largest and oldest government school in Thiruvarur district, the Bharathidasan University Model College located at Velur, Thiruthuraipoondi, one teacher training institute at Paruthichery, Thiruthuraipoondi, one Industrial training institutes (ITI) and polytechnic college at Korukkai, Thiruthuraipoondi.

Villages
 

Keelaperumalai

Footnotes

References 

 
 
 
 
 
 
 
 
 
 
 
 
 
 
 
 

Cities and towns in Tiruvarur district